The Superbus is a prototype high speed electric coach-like limo car that is capable of carrying 23 passengers at speeds of up to  on specially designed segregated highway lanes. The Superbus project, led by Dutch astronaut professor Wubbo Ockels of the Delft University of Technology until his death in 2014 envisages a comfortable, demand-dependent door-to-door transportation rivalling the car and the train. The project, which encompasses infrastructure, logistics, safety, reliability and economic viability, in addition to the design of the vehicle itself, has received funding of €10 million, largely provided by the Dutch State.

The vehicle

Super lanes
It is envisaged that the vehicle will run on special 'super lanes' which will be geothermically heated in order to prevent icing in the winter season.

Logistics
Rather than following a timetable, the vehicle will be routed in response to the needs of the particular passengers offering a complete journey without changes based on central routing optimization system.

References

Transport in the Netherlands
Delft University of Technology
Emerging technologies
Buses by type
Dutch inventions